New England is the seventh studio album by rock band Wishbone Ash released only seven months after Locked In. It was a success compared to Locked In but still did not chart as high as most of their previous albums. It peaked at No. 22 in the UK Albums Chart. This album marked the "Americanization" of Wishbone Ash, as the band relocated from England to the Northeastern United States (New England) for tax purposes.

New England contained an even balance of hard rock songs and breezy, soft rock ballads, the latter of which would see further exploration from Wishbone Ash on their next studio album, Front Page News.

Track listing 
All songs written and composed by Martin Turner, Andy Powell, Laurie Wisefield and Steve Upton; except "Candlelight" by Martin Turner, Andy Powell, Laurie Wisefield, Steve Upton and Ted Turner.

Side one 
 "Mother of Pearl" – 4:25
 "(In All of My Dreams) You Rescue Me" – 6:09
 "Runaway" – 3:14
 "Lorelei" – 5:20

Side two 
 "Outward Bound" – 4:48
 "Prelude" – 1:13
 "When You Know Love" – 5:43
 "Lonely Island" – 4:23
 "Candlelight" – 1:47

Personnel 
Wishbone Ash
Martin Turner – bass, lead vocals
Andy Powell – electric and acoustic guitars, backing vocals, mandolin
Laurie Wisefield – electric and slide guitars, backing vocals
Steve Upton – drums

Additional personnel
 Nelson "Flaco" Padron – percussion

Charts

References 

Wishbone Ash albums
1976 albums
Albums with cover art by Hipgnosis
MCA Records albums